Hainaut may refer to:
 County of Hainaut, a historical Holy Roman Empire lordship in modern-day Belgium and northern France
 French Hainaut, a part of the modern Nord department
 Hainaut Province, a modern Belgian province, part of Wallonia
 Hainaut-Sambre, a former Belgian steel conglomerate

See also
 Hainau (disambiguation)
 Hainault (disambiguation)
Henao, the Spanish name for the region, now also used as a surname